Henry Nicol (1845–1880) was a philologist specialized in French phonology.  Cousin of Henry Sweet, Nicol was persuaded in 1871 by Frederick James Furnivall to take over the editorship of OED but was prevented by ill health and other problems to do so.

References 

 Lexicography and the OED: pioneers in the untrodden forest. Lynda Mugglestone.

External links

1845 births
1880 deaths